The Duchy of Cornwall (No. 2) Act 1844 (7 & 8 Vict c 105), sometimes called the Duchy of Cornwall (Limitation of Time) Act 1844, is an Act of the Parliament of the United Kingdom.

The whole Act, except sections 39, 40, 53 to 70 and 92 and the Schedules, was repealed by section 1(1) of, and Part IV of Schedule 1 to, the Statute Law (Repeals) Act 1978.

Section 92
In this section, the definitions of "Oath" and "Conventionary Tenant" were repealed by section 1(1) of, and Part IV of Schedule 1 to, the Statute Law (Repeals) Act 1978.

References

External links

The Duchy of Cornwall (No. 2) Act 1844, as amended, from Legislation.gov.uk.
The Duchy of Cornwall (No. 2) Act 1844, as originally enacted, from Legislation.gov.uk.

United Kingdom Acts of Parliament 1844
Duchy of Cornwall
19th century in Cornwall